Thomas Bodkin, fl. 1506–1507, was the first member of the Bodkin family to be elected Mayor of Galway. The Bodkins were one of The Tribes of Galway, and a sept of the FitzGerald family. He would be succeeded in office by John Bodkin fitz Richard (1518–1519, died 1523), Richard Bodkin (1610–1611), and John Bodkin fitz Dominick (1639–1640).

See also

 Matthias McDonnell Bodkin
 Thomas Bodkin
 Matthias Bodkin
 Tribes of Galway
 Galway

References
 History of Galway, James Hardiman, Galway, 1820.
 Old Galway, Maureen Donovan O'Sullivan, 1942.
 Henry, William (2002). Role of Honour: The Mayors of Galway City 1485-2001. Galway: Galway City Council.  
 Martyn, Adrian (2016). The Tribes of Galway: 1124-1642

Mayors of Galway
Politicians from County Galway